Hocking Hills State Park is a state park in the Hocking Hills region of Hocking County, Ohio, United States. In some areas the park adjoins the Hocking State Forest. The trails are open from dawn to dusk, all year round, including holidays.

The park contains seven separate hiking areas: Ash Cave, Cantwell Cliffs, Cedar Falls, Conkle's Hollow (nature preserve), Old Man's Cave, Rock House and Hemlock Bridge Trail to Whispering Cave.

History
The name Hocking Hills

Hocking County was named after the Hockhocking River. Hockhocking, in the Delaware tongue, signifies a bottle. In Shawnee, Wea-tha-Kagh-Qua-sepe, meant bottle river. The Hockhocking River had a waterfall of nearly 20 feet located about 6 or 7 miles northwest of Lancaster. Above the falls, the creek was very narrow and straight, forming the "bottle" neck.

The Hockhocking enters the county from Good Hope Township in the northwest and then flows southwest, touches Marion Township, continues through Falls and Green Townships, and exits the county through northwestern Starr Township. The river is then in Athens County.

History of the Park

More than 330 million years ago, the area was relatively level and covered by the waters of the Atlantic Ocean. For millions of years, the ocean's currents deposited immense amounts of sand and gravel. After millions of years, the ocean receded, and the sandy layers bonded with silica to form the Black Hand Sandstone that underlies the area. It formed like a sandwich, with a hard top and bottom and a soft middle layer. When the Appalachian Mountains arose, form and feature were cast upon the area and created the Hocking Hills.

Hocking Hills were hemmed in by the ancient north-flowing Teays River to the west, and the then north-flowing Hocking to the east. The landscape remained fairly static for millions of years. Any changes were minuscule, and were slow to develop. When the Wisconsin Glacier began melting back to the north about 10,000 years ago, the landscape would undergo dramatic changes. The glacier stopped in northern Hocking County, so the area suffered indescribable flooding. The ancient Teays River was buried under tons of glacial silt, and the direction of the Hocking River was reversed.

When the glacial torrents found cracks in the hard capstone, the water poured through to flush out the soft middle layer. This left long tunnels where the gorges are today. Eventually, the weight of the tops caused them to come crashing down. The "slump rocks" in the gorges today are what's left of the hard top layer. In just a few centuries, the rushing waters of the glacier carved the soft middle layer of sandstone into the myriad dimples and wrinkles that decorate the cliffs and grottos today.

Early settlers in Muskingum County found an ancient black human handprint on a cliff that is part of this same sandstone formation. That is the same "Black Hand Sandstone" that is seen in six areas of the Hocking Hills State Park.

The Adena culture is believed to be one of the first inhabitants of the area of Hocking Hills. In the 18th century, the Native American Tribes of Delaware, Wyandot, and Shawnee travelled through and lived in the area. In 1818, Hocking County was created in Ohio. A powder mill was built in the area in the 1830s and in 1840 Hocking Canal was completed, allowing for more settlers to travel there. After local popular hiking areas were threatened by the accessibility of more traffic, the State Forest Law was passed in 1915 allowing the state to purchase the first parcel of land in Hocking Hills around Old Man's Cave.

Hocking Honor Camp Reforestation

Hocking Hills' iconic and unusual hemlock forest of Hocking Hills was extensively established by the Civilian Conservation Corp and Division of Forestry in the 1930s.  Additional planting and reforestry work took place during the 1950s by "prisoners from the Hocking Honor Camp." Inmates "worked on tree planting, cleaning plantations and pruning more established plantations. The prisoners earned five cents per hour for their labor if they had dependents, otherwise they earned half a cent per hour for their hard work." This unique model of using inmates to provide social good is striking. According to the Logan Daily News, Hocking Honor inmates "worked closely with the Hocking County area and the community, an idea that seems absurd today"

Tourist Accommodations
There are about 200 campsites in Hocking Hills State Park Campground, including full hookup and electric camp sites with 20-, 30- or 50-amp service, and camping shelters. The park also offers primitive "hike-in" tent-only sites and a primitive Group Camp in their own areas of the park. The campground is close to all of the hiking trails in the area and has flush toilets, shower houses with hot water, vending machines, a camp store, a pool, and other amenities. Reservations for camping may be made up to 6 months in advance.

A full-service resort lodge, Hocking Hills State Park Lodge and Conference Center, opened in the state park in autumn 2022 and offers 81 guest rooms as well as a full-service restaurant, fitness room, and indoor and outdoor swimming pools.  The lodge is also the point of contact for cabin stays inside the state park. Reservations for the Lodge and Cabins are made through the contracted management company, Great Ohio Lodges.

There are also many privately owned cabins and hotels in the area.

In 2017, over 2 million people visited Hocking Hills. To handle the growing tourism, a summer shuttle service from downtown Logan began to lessen the overtaxing on the park's parking facilities.

Attractions

The area is very popular with tourists and collectively is known as the Hocking Hills Region. It features many private inns, campgrounds, cabins, restaurants, and other related businesses, including a recently developed zipline. Other attractions include:

Nature Preserves and State Parks: Nearby are also other attractions of the Hocking Hills, including Hocking State Forest, Conkles Hollow State Nature Preserve, Lake Logan State Park, and Rockbridge State Nature Preserve. The deep gorges and high cliffs result from the erosion-resistant Blackhand Sandstone, which extends well to the northeast of the Hocking Hills. Other open-space areas have been established within the range of the Blackhand, including Lake Katharine State Nature Preserve.  
 Lakes: Lake Logan in Hocking Hills State Park covers 400 acres, 320 acres of which is dry land, and is two miles long. The lake was built in 1955 for recreational purposes and offers visitors hiking, boating, picnicking and swimming.
 Canoeing and kayaking are popular activities in the Hocking Hills 
 Boating: Canoeing, kayaking and rafting are all allowed on various places in the state park.
 Rock Climbing and Rappelling: Ninety-nine acres of forest land have been set aside for rock clim bing and rappelling in Hocking State Forest.
 Swimming: Lake Logan and Rose Lake offer swimming and beaches for visitors. There is also a swimming pool open to the public outside of the Hocking Hills State Park lodge. 
 Hunting and fishing: Hunting and fishing are permitted as regulated by the Division of Wildlife. With permits, visitors are allowed to hunt during hunting season. Fishing is permitted in Lake Logan, which can include a variety of fish such as bluegill, crappie, bass, saugeye and catfish.

 Bird Watching: Hocking Valley Birding Trail identifies opportunities for bird watchers to enjoy the avian life in Hocking Hills. 
 Archery: The Hocking Hills State Park offers a free archery range. 
 Air Tours: Hocking Hills Scenic Air Tours offers airplane rides with views of the State Park.
 Horseback Riding: Hocking Hills State Park provides horseback riding trails that share space with both hiking trails and hunting areas.
 Train Rides: The trains of the Hocking Valley Scenic Railway provide visitors a glimpse into the transportation and industrial history of the Hocking Hills area.
 Weddings: Some individuals have chosen to use the State Park as their outdoor wedding ceremony location.
 Canopy Tours: Nearby the State Park is Hocking Hills Canopy Tours, an outdoor zipline tour that offers three different rides: a SuperZip, Nightflight and traditional canopy tour. The Hocking Hills region was recently named the Canopy Tour Capital of the Midwest.
 Astronomy: The John Glenn Astronomy Park, named after astronaut and US Senator John Glenn, opened in June 2018. During the day, visitors can study the position of the sun and orientation throughout the year. At night, visitors can see the planets and stars not being obstructed by light pollution.

Flora

Several rare plants are known from this area, including plants that are outside their normal range. Canadian yew, bigleaf magnolia, and many others are here.

Trails

There are numerous hiking trails, including several safe for pets, located throughout the state park.

Some trails in Hocking Hills State Park include: 
 Old Man's Cave: 1 mile
 Ash Cave Gorge:  mile, wheelchair accessible
 Ash Cave Rim:  mile
 Cedar Falls:  mile
 Rock House: 1 mile
 Cantwell Cliffs: 1 mile
 Whispering Cave: 4.5 miles, difficult
 Conkle's Hollow: 1 mile
 Conkle's Hollow Rim: 2 miles
 Buckeye Trail: Cedar Falls – Ash Cave: 3 miles, Old Man's Cave – Cedar Falls: 3 miles

In popular culture

Many of the adventures in Jeff Smith's comic book series Bone take place in Old Man's Cave, a place inspired by the Hocking Hills State Park, which Smith enjoyed since he was a child. The waterfalls of the park also influenced Smith's frequent use of water as a recurring visual element in Bone, calling it "an age-old storytelling symbol".

Other public lands

As noted, Hocking Hills State Park is embedded within the Hocking State Forest. Crane Hollow Nature Preserve, a private preserve, fills in a large part of the non-public area. On the south side, Camp Oti-Okwa, owned by Big Brothers-Big Sisters, is also a sizeable protected area. There are three state nature preserves within the Forest, but only Conkles Hollow State Nature Preserve is open to the public. Also nearby are Clear Creek Metro Park, Lake Logan State Park, and Rockbridge State Nature Preserve.

See also
 Appalachian Ohio
 Appalachia
 Wayne National Forest

References 

Hocking Hills State park on ohiodnr.gov

External links

 Hocking Hills State Park at Ohio Department of Natural Resources
 Hocking Hills at American Byways
 at Hocking Hills Tourism Association

State parks of Ohio
State parks of the Appalachians
Protected areas established in 1924
Protected areas of Hocking County, Ohio